Sharon Levy (born June 1, 1987) is an Israeli footballer currently playing for Maccabi Bnei Reineh.

External links
 

Living people
1987 births
Israeli Jews
Israeli footballers
Hapoel Haifa F.C. players
Maccabi Ironi Kiryat Ata F.C. players
Ironi Tiberias F.C. players
Ironi Nesher F.C. players
Maccabi Tzur Shalom F.C. players
Hapoel Iksal F.C. players
Hapoel Umm al-Fahm F.C. players
Maccabi Ahi Nazareth F.C. players
Maccabi Bnei Reineh F.C. players
Liga Leumit players
Israeli Premier League players
Footballers from Nahariya
Association football defenders